Samuel David Bates (born 14 September 1999) is an English cricketer. He made his first-class debut on 21 September 2021, for Leicestershire in the 2021 County Championship.

References

External links
 

1999 births
Living people
English cricketers
Leicestershire cricketers
Cricketers from Leicester